Collar (commonly stylised as COLLAR) is a Hong Kong Cantopop girl group formed from a television channel ViuTV's reality talent show King Maker IV operated by the broadcaster HK Television Entertainment in 2021. The group consists of eight members: Sumling Li, Garie Shum (Gao), Natalie So (So Ching), Winka Chan, Ivy So, Rejena Simkhada (Day), Marife Yau (Marf) and Candy Wong. They debuted on 12 January 2022, with the first single "Call My Name!".

History

2021-22: Formation
In July 2018, ViuTV's reality talent competition series  started scouting for potential artists, and after three seasons, three boy bands, namely Mirror, Error and P1X3L were formed, and some contestants debuted as solo singers. Nonetheless, since the first season of show had started, there was no any girl group which was formed. Hence, ViuTV created King Maker IV as a platform to scout for a brand new girl group in June 2021.

On 25 December 2021, ViuTV announced the winner, first runner-up and second runner-up of King Maker IV, Marife Yau, Garie Shum, and Rejena Simkhada, who were secured the spots of upcoming members of the group. On 12 January 2022, 8 contestants from King Maker IV were announced from the Top 20 of the season, formed the group through a press conference named "Hold Your Breath" which held in Harbour City. In the press conference, the name of the group "Collar", along with five other members, Sumling Li, Natalie So, Winka Chan, Ivy So and Candy Wong, were announced in the lineup.

The music video of Collar's debut "Call My Name!" was released a day after the formation of the group. On 24 January 2022, Pocari Sweat, a Japanese sports drink brand, appointed Collar as endorsers of the brand's 40th anniversary in Harbour City, marking the group's first commercial endorsement.

Collar gained their first peak chart in Metro Radio with their debut "Call My Name!" on 19 February 2022. On 30 May 2022, Collar's first variety show  was broadcast on ViuTV.

Besides "Call My Name!", Collar also released three other singles in 2022, namely "Never-never Land", "" and "". They were also awarded "Best Groups Bronze Awards" at Ultimate Song Chart Awards Presentation 2022.

Name 
According to the group leader Garie Shum, the group's name "Collar" has two meanings: first, it refers to a collar of the shirt, which indicates a person can't breathe when the collar is fastened, means every performance can "hold your breath" and makes the audience hold their breath; second, it refers to a clavicle, which is the most attractive body part of women and defines Collar becomes the most attractive girl group.

Members

Discography

Singles

Filmography

Television shows

Awards and nominations

References

External links

 
 
 

Hong Kong girl groups
Cantopop musical groups
Musical groups established in 2022
2022 establishments in Hong Kong
Hong Kong idols
King Maker IV contestants
MakerVille artists